A symbolic language is a method of communication that uses characters or images to represent concepts.

Symbolic language may refer to:

 Symbolic language (art)
 Symbolic language (engineering)
 Symbolic language (literature)
 Symbolic language (mathematics)
 Symbolic language (programming)